Sunbury Armory is a historic National Guard armory located near Sunbury, in Upper Augusta Township, Northumberland County, Pennsylvania.  It was built in 1938, and is a two-story, "I"-plan building consisting of an administration section, stable, and drill hall.  It is constructed of concrete block with a brick veneer and executed in the Moderne style.

It was added to the National Register of Historic Places in 1989.

References

Armories on the National Register of Historic Places in Pennsylvania
Moderne architecture in Pennsylvania
Infrastructure completed in 1938
Buildings and structures in Northumberland County, Pennsylvania
National Register of Historic Places in Northumberland County, Pennsylvania